The Lockheed C-5 Galaxy is a large military transport aircraft designed and built by Lockheed, and now maintained and upgraded by its successor, Lockheed Martin. It provides the United States Air Force (USAF) with a heavy intercontinental-range strategic airlift capability, one that can carry outsized and oversized loads, including all air-certifiable cargo. The Galaxy has many similarities to the smaller Lockheed C-141 Starlifter and the later Boeing C-17 Globemaster III. The C-5 is among the largest military aircraft in the world.

The C-5 Galaxy's development was complicated, including significant cost overruns, and Lockheed suffered significant financial difficulties. Shortly after entering service, cracks in the wings of many aircraft were discovered and the C-5 fleet was restricted in capability until corrective work was completed. The C-5M Super Galaxy is an upgraded version with new engines and modernized avionics designed to extend its service life to 2040 and beyond.

The USAF has operated the C-5 since 1969. In that time, the airlifter supported US military operations in all major conflicts including Vietnam, Iraq, Yugoslavia, and Afghanistan, as well as allied support, such as Israel during the Yom Kippur War and operations in the Gulf War. The Galaxy has also distributed humanitarian aid, provided disaster relief, and supported the US space program.

Development

CX-X and Heavy Logistics System
In 1961, several aircraft companies began studying heavy jet transport designs that would replace the Douglas C-133 Cargomaster and complement Lockheed C-141 Starlifters. In addition to higher overall performance, the United States Army wanted a transport aircraft with a larger cargo bay than the C-141, whose interior was too small to carry a variety of their outsized equipment. These studies led to the "CX-4" design concept, but in 1962, the proposed six-engined design was rejected, because it was not viewed as a significant advance over the C-141. By late 1963, the next conceptual design was named CX-X. It was equipped with four engines, instead of six in the earlier CX-4 concept. USAF studies showed that high-bypass turbofan engines were needed for thrust and fuel efficiency requirements.

The criteria were finalized and an official request for proposal was issued in April 1964 for the "Heavy Logistics System" (CX-HLS) (previously CX-X). In May 1964, proposals for aircraft were received from Boeing, Douglas, General Dynamics, Lockheed, and Martin Marietta. General Electric, Curtiss-Wright, and Pratt & Whitney submitted proposals for the engines. After a downselect, Boeing, Douglas, and Lockheed were given one-year study contracts for the airframe, along with General Electric and Pratt & Whitney for the engines. All three of the designs shared a number of features. The cockpit was placed well above the cargo area to allow for cargo loading through a nose door. The Boeing and Douglas designs used a pod on the top of the fuselage containing the cockpit, while the Lockheed design extended the cockpit profile down the length of the fuselage, giving it an egg-shaped cross section. All of the designs had swept wings, as well as front and rear cargo doors, allowing simultaneous loading and unloading. Lockheed's design featured a T-tail, while the designs by Boeing and Douglas had conventional tails.

The Air Force considered Boeing's design to be better than that of Lockheed, but Lockheed's proposal was the lowest total-cost bid. Lockheed was selected as the winner in September 1965, then awarded a contract in December 1965. General Electric's TF39 engine was selected in August 1965 to power the new transport plane. At the time, GE's engine concept was revolutionary, as all engines before had a bypass ratio less than two-to-one, while the TF39 promised and would achieve a ratio of eight-to-one, which had the benefits of increased engine thrust and lower fuel consumption. Boeing lost the military contract but went on to develop the successful 747 civilian airliner with over 1,500 aircraft built when manufacturing ended in 2022 after 54 years of production.

Into production
The first C-5A Galaxy (serial number 66-8303) was rolled out of the manufacturing plant in Marietta, Georgia, on 2 March 1968. On 30 June 1968, flight testing of the C-5A began with the first flight, flown by Leo Sullivan, with the call sign "eight-three-oh-three heavy". Flight tests revealed that the aircraft exhibited a higher drag divergence Mach number than predicted by wind tunnel data. The maximum lift coefficient measured in flight with the flaps deflected 40° was higher than predicted (2.60 vs. 2.38), but was lower than predicted with the flaps deflected 25° (2.31 vs. 2.38) and with the flaps retracted (1.45 vs. 1.52).

Aircraft weight was a serious issue during design and development. At the time of the first flight, the weight was below the guaranteed weight, but by the time of the delivery of the 9th aircraft, had exceeded guarantees. In July 1969, during a fuselage upbending test, the wing failed at 128% of limit load, which is below the requirement that it sustain 150% of limit load. Changes were made to the wing, but during a test in July 1970, it failed at 125% of limit load. At the time, a 90% probability was predicted that no more than 10% of the fleet of 79 airframes would reach their fatigue life of 19,000 hours without cracking of the wing.

Cost overruns and technical problems of the C-5A were the subject of a congressional investigation in 1968 and 1969. The C-5 program has the dubious distinction of being the first development program with a $1billion (equivalent to $ billion today) overrun. Due to the C-5's troubled development, the Department of Defense abandoned Total Package Procurement. In 1969, Henry Durham raised concerns about the C-5 production process with Lockheed, his employer. Subsequently, Durham was transferred and subjected to abuse until he resigned. The Government Accountability Office substantiated some of his charges against Lockheed. Later, the American Ethical Union honored Durham with the Elliott-Black Award. The Deputy Assistant Secretary of the Air Force for Management Systems, Ernest Fitzgerald, was another person whose fostering of public accountability was unwelcome.

Upon completion of testing in December 1969, the first C-5A was transferred to the Transitional Training Unit at Altus Air Force Base, Oklahoma. Lockheed delivered the first operational Galaxy to the 437th Airlift Wing, Charleston Air Force Base, South Carolina, in June 1970. Due to higher than expected development costs, in 1970, public calls were made for the government to split the substantial losses that Lockheed was experiencing. Production was nearly brought to a halt in 1971 as Lockheed went through financial difficulties, due in part to the C-5 Galaxy's development, as well as a civilian jet liner, the Lockheed L-1011. The U.S. government gave loans to Lockheed to keep the company operational.

In the early 1970s, NASA considered the C-5 for the Shuttle Carrier Aircraft role, to transport the Space Shuttle to Kennedy Space Center. However, they rejected it in favor of the Boeing 747, in part due to the 747's low-wing design. In contrast, the Soviet Union chose to transport its shuttles using the high-winged An-225, which derived from the An-124, which is similar in design and function to the C-5.

During static and fatigue testing, cracks were noticed in the wings of several aircraft, and as a consequence, the C-5A fleet was restricted to 80% of maximum design loads. To reduce wing loading, load alleviation systems were added to the aircraft. A $1.5 billion program (equivalent to $ billion today), known as H-Mod, to re-wing the 76 completed C-5As to restore full payload capability and service life began in 1976. After design and testing of the new wing design, the C-5As received their new wings from 1980 to 1987.

Restarted production and development
In 1974, Iran, then having good relations with the United States, offered $160 million (equivalent to $ million today) to restart C-5 production to enable Iran to purchase aircraft for their own air force, in a similar climate as to their acquisition of F-14 Tomcat fighters. However, no C-5 aircraft were ever ordered by Iran, and the prospect was firmly halted by the Iranian Revolution in 1979.

As part of President Ronald Reagan's military policy, funding was made available for expansion of the USAF's airlift capability. With the C-17 program still some years from completion, Congress approved funding for a new version of the C-5, the C-5B, in July 1982, to expand airlift capacity. The first C-5B was delivered to Altus Air Force Base in January 1986. In April 1989, the last of 50 C-5B aircraft was added to the 77 C-5As in the Air Force's airlift force structure. The C-5B includes all C-5A improvements and numerous additional system modifications to improve reliability and maintainability.

In 1998, the Avionics Modernization Program (AMP) began upgrading the C-5's avionics to include a glass cockpit, navigation equipment, and a new autopilot system. Another part of the C-5 modernization effort is the Reliability Enhancement and Re-engining Program (RERP). The program replaced the engines with newer, more powerful ones.

A total of 52 C-5s are contracted to be modernized, consisting of 49 B-, two C- and one A-model aircraft through the RERP. The program features over 70 changes and upgrades, including the newer General Electric engines. Three C-5s underwent RERP for testing purposes. Low-rate initial production started in August 2009 with Lockheed reaching full production in May 2011; 22 C-5M Super Galaxies have been completed as of August 2014. RERP upgrades were completed on 25 July 2018. The Air Force received the last modified aircraft on 1 August 2018.

, Lockheed is investigating drag reduction by plasma-heating of turbulent transonic airflow in critical points, saving overall weight by reducing fuel consumption. The Air Force Research Laboratory is looking at shape-memory alloy for speed-dependent vortex generators.

Design

The C-5 is a large, high-wing cargo aircraft with a distinctive high T-tail fin (vertical) stabilizer, with four TF39 turbofan engines mounted on pylons beneath wings that are swept 25°. (The C-5M uses newer GE CF6 engines.) Similar in layout to its smaller predecessor, the C-141 Starlifter, the C-5 has 12 internal wing tanks and is equipped for aerial refueling. Above the plane-length cargo deck is an upper deck for flight operations and for seating 80 passengers in rear facing seats (unlike most commercial airplanes) and the embarked loadmaster crew in forward facing seats. Bay doors at both nose and tail open to enable "drive-through" loading and unloading of cargo.

The cargo hold of the C-5 is  longer than the entire length of the first powered flight by the Wright brothers at Kitty Hawk. For its voracious consumption of fuel and its maintenance and reliability issues the Galaxy's aircrews have nicknamed it "FRED", for Fucking Ridiculous Economic/Environmental Disaster.

Its high-flotation main landing gear provides 28 wheels to distribute gross weight on paved or earth surfaces. The rear main landing gear can be made to caster to make a smaller turning radius, and rotates 90° after takeoff before being retracted. "Kneeling" landing gear permits lowering the aircraft when parked, thereby presenting the cargo deck at truck-bed height to facilitate loading and unloading operations.

The C-5 features a malfunction detection analysis and recording system to identify errors throughout the aircraft.
It can accommodate up to 36 463L master pallets or a mix of palletized cargo and vehicles. The nose and aft cargo-bay doors open the full width and height of the cargo bay to maximize efficient loading of oversized equipment. Full-width ramps enable loading double rows of vehicles from either end of the cargo hold.

Operational history

The first C-5A was delivered to the USAF on 17 December 1969. Wings were built up in the early 1970s at Altus AFB, Oklahoma; Charleston AFB, South Carolina; Dover AFB, Delaware; and Travis AFB, California. The C-5's first mission was on 9 July 1970, in Southeast Asia during the Vietnam War. C-5s were used to transport equipment and troops, including Army tanks and even some small aircraft, throughout the later years of the US action in Vietnam. In the final weeks of the war, prior to the Fall of Saigon, several C-5s were involved in evacuation efforts. During one such mission, a C-5A crashed while transporting a large number of orphans, with over 140 killed.

C-5s have also been used to deliver support and reinforce various US allies over the years. During the Yom Kippur War in 1973, multiple C-5s and C-141 Starlifters delivered critical supplies of ammunition, replacement weaponry and other forms of aid to Israel, the US effort was named as Operation Nickel Grass. The C-5 Galaxy's performance in Israel was such that the Pentagon began to consider further purchases. The C-5 was regularly made available to support American allies, such as the British-led peacekeeper initiative in Zimbabwe in 1979.

The missile descended to  before its rocket engine fired. The 10-second engine burn carried the missile to  again before it dropped into the ocean. The test proved the feasibility of launching an intercontinental ballistic missile from the air. Operational deployment was discarded due to engineering and security difficulties, though the capability was used as a negotiating point in the Strategic Arms Limitation Talks. Aircraft 69–0014, "Zero-One-Four" used in the test was retired to the Air Mobility Command Museum at Dover Air Force Base.

The C-5 has been used for several unusual functions. During the development of the secretive stealth fighter, the Lockheed F-117 Nighthawk, Galaxies were often used to carry partly disassembled aircraft, leaving no exterior signs as to their cargo. The C-5 remains the largest aircraft to operate in the Antarctic, capable of operating from Williams Field near McMurdo Station. The C-5 Galaxy was a major supply asset in the international coalition operations in 1990–91 against Iraq in the Gulf War. C-5s have routinely delivered relief aid and humanitarian supplies to areas afflicted with natural disasters or crisis; multiple flights were made over Rwanda in 1994.
The C-5 is also used to transport Marine One.

The wings on the C-5As were replaced during the 1980s to restore full design capability. The USAF took delivery of the first C-5B on 28 December 1985 and the final one in April 1989. The reliability of the C-5 fleet has been a continued issue throughout its lifetime, however the C-5M upgrade program seeks in part to address this issue. Their strategic airlift capacity has been a key logistical component of U.S. military operations in Afghanistan and Iraq. Following an incident during Operation Iraqi Freedom where one C-5 was damaged by a projectile, the installation of defensive systems has become a stated priority.

The C-5 AMP and RERP modernization programs plan to raise mission-capable rate to a minimum goal of 75%. Over the next 40 years, the U.S. Air Force estimates the C-5M will save over $20 billion. The first C-5M conversion was completed on 16 May 2006 and C-5Ms began test flights at Dobbins Air Reserve Base in June 2006. In 2008, the USAF decided to convert remaining C-5Bs and C-5Cs into C-5Ms with avionics upgrades and re-engining. The C-5As will receive only the avionics upgrades. The last of 52 C-5Ms was delivered to Air Mobility Command in August 2018.

In response to Air Force plans to retire older C-5 aircraft, Congress implemented legislation that set limits on retirement plans for C-5As in 2003. As of November 2013, 45 C-5As have been retired, 11 have been scrapped, parts of one (A/C 66-8306) are now a cargo load trainer at Lackland AFB, Texas, and one was sent to the Warner Robins Air Logistics Center (WR-ALC) for tear down and inspection to evaluate structural integrity and estimate the remaining life for the fleet.

The U.S. Air Force began to receive refitted C-5M aircraft in December 2008. Full production of C-5Ms began in the summer of 2009. In 2009, the Congressional ban on the retirement of C-5s was overturned. The Air Force seeks to retire one C-5A for every 10 new C-17s ordered. In October 2011, the 445th Airlift Wing based at Wright-Patterson Air Force Base replaced all remaining C-5s with C-17s. The C-5M reached initial operating capability (IOC) on 24 February 2014 with 16 aircraft delivered.

On 13 September 2009, a C-5M set 41 new records and flight data was submitted to the National Aeronautic Association for formal recognition.

On 18 July 2017, C-5s based at Dover were ordered to stand down so maintenance crews could determine the cause for some nose landing gear failing. The last TF39-powered C-5 flew in late 2017.

Variants

C-5A

The C-5A is the original version of the C-5. From 1969 to 1973, 81 C-5As were delivered to the Military Airlift Command of the U.S. Air Force. Due to cracks found in the wings in the mid-1970s, the cargo weight was restricted. To restore the C-5's full capability, the wing structure was redesigned. A program to install new strengthened wings on 77 C-5As was conducted from 1981 to 1987. The redesigned wing made use of a new aluminum alloy that did not exist during the original production. As of August 2016, there were 10 A-models in service flown by the Air Force Reserve Command's 433d Airlift Wing at Lackland AFB / Kelly Field, Texas, and 439th Airlift Wing at Westover ARB, Massachusetts. The last operational C-5A was retired on 7 September 2017.

C-5B
The C-5B is an improved version of the C-5A. It incorporated all modifications and improvements made to the C-5A with improved wings, simplified landing gear, upgraded TF-39-GE-1C turbofan engines and updated avionics. Fifty examples of the new variant were delivered to the U.S. Air Force from 1986 to 1989.

C-5C
The C-5C is a specially modified variant for transporting large cargo. Two C-5As (68-0213 and 68-0216) were modified following major accidents to have a larger internal cargo capacity to accommodate large payloads, such as satellites. The major modifications were the removal of the rear passenger compartment floor, splitting the rear cargo door in the middle, and installing a new movable aft bulkhead further to the rear. The official C-5 technical manual refers to the version as C-5A(SCM) Space Cargo Modified. Modifications also included adding a second inlet for ground power, which can feed any power-dependent equipment that may form part of the cargo. The two C-5Cs are operated by U.S. Air Force crews for DOD spacecraft programs and NASA, and are stationed at Travis AFB, California. Both C-5Cs #68-0213 and #68-0216 have been modified into C-5Ms as of 2017.

C-5D
Proposed during the 1990s Non-Developmental Airlift Aircraft (NDAA) program as an alternative to  further purchases of the McDonnell Douglas C-17 Globemaster III as well as a replacement for older C-5As. The C-5D was to have General Electric F138-GE-100 (CF6-80C2) engines, improved avionics and significantly improved reliability and maintainability, although it could not use austere runways or conduct airdrop operations and had a higher expected operating cost. The plan was canceled in favor of the purchase of more C-17s. The specifications of the C-5D were later used in the C-5M upgrade program.

C-5 AMP and C-5M Super Galaxy

Following a study showing that 80% of the C-5 airframe's service life was remaining, Air Mobility Command (AMC) began an aggressive program to modernize all remaining C-5Bs and C-5Cs and many of the C-5As. The C-5 Avionics Modernization Program (AMP) began in 1998 and includes upgrading the avionics to comply with Global Air Traffic Management standards, improving communications, fitting new flat-panel displays, improving navigation and safety equipment, and installing a new autopilot system. The first flight of a C-5 with AMP (85-0004) occurred on 21 December 2002.

The Reliability Enhancement and Re-engining Program (RERP) began in 2006. It includes fitting new General Electric F138-GE-100 (CF6-80C2) engines, pylons and auxiliary power units, and upgrades to aircraft skin and frame, landing gear, cockpit and pressurization systems. Each CF6 engine produces 22% more thrust, providing a 30% shorter takeoff, a 38% higher climb rate to initial altitude, an increased cargo load and a longer range. Upgraded C-5s are designated C-5M Super Galaxy.

L-500
Lockheed also planned a civilian version of the C-5 Galaxy, the L-500, the company designation also used for the C-5 itself. Both passenger and cargo versions of the L-500 were designed. The all-passenger version would have been able to carry up to 1,000 travelers, while the all-cargo version was predicted to be able to carry typical C-5 volume for as little as 2 cents per ton-mile (in 1967 dollars). Although some interest was expressed by carriers, no orders were placed for either L-500 version, due to operational costs caused by low fuel efficiency, a significant concern for a profit-making carrier, even before the oil crisis of the 1970s, keen competition from Boeing's 747, and high costs incurred by Lockheed in developing the C-5, and later the L-1011, which led to the governmental rescue of the company.

C-5 Shuttle Carrier
Lockheed proposed a twin body C-5 as a Shuttle Carrier Aircraft to counter the Conroy Virtus, but the design was turned down in favor of the Boeing 747.

Operators

United States Air Force – 52 C-5Ms in service as of August 2018

Air Mobility Command
60th Air Mobility Wing – Travis Air Force Base, California
22nd Airlift Squadron, 1972–present

436th Airlift Wing – Dover Air Force Base, Delaware
9th Airlift Squadron, 1971–present

Air Force Reserve Command
349th Air Mobility Wing (Associate) – Travis Air Force Base, California
312th Airlift Squadron, 1973–present

413th Flight Test Group – Robins AFB, Georgia
339th Flight Test Squadron, 1998–present

433d Airlift Wing – Kelly Field Annex, Texas
68th Airlift Squadron, 1985–present
356th Airlift Squadron, 2007–present

439th Airlift Wing – Westover Air Reserve Base, Massachusetts
337th Airlift Squadron, 1987–present

512th Airlift Wing (Associate) – Dover Air Force Base, Delaware
709th Airlift Squadron, 1973–present

Former operators
Military Airlift Command/Air Mobility Command
60th Military Airlift Wing/Air Mobility Wing – Travis Air Force Base, California
21st Airlift Squadron, 1993–2006
75th Military Airlift Squadron, 1970–1992
436th Military Airlift Wing/Airlift Wing – Dover Air Force Base, Delaware
3d Military Airlift Squadron/Airlift Squadron, 1973–2007
31st Military Airlift Squadron/Airlift Squadron, 1989–1994
437th Military Airlift Wing – Charleston Air Force Base, South Carolina
3d Military Airlift Squadron, 1970–1973
443d Military Airlift Wing – Altus Air Force Base, Oklahoma
56th Military Airlift Squadron, 1969–1992
97th Air Mobility Wing – Altus AFB, Oklahoma
56th Military Airlift/56th Airlift Squadron, 1992–2007

Air Force Reserve
349th Military Airlift Wing/Air Mobility Wing (Associate) – Travis Air Force Base, California
301st Military Airlift Squadron/Airlift Squadron, 1973–2006
445th Military Airlift Wing/445th Airlift Wing – Wright-Patterson AFB, Ohio
89th Airlift Squadron, 2006–2012
512th Military Airlift Wing/Airlift Wing(Associate) – Dover Air Force Base, Delaware
326th Military Airlift Squadron/Airlift Squadron, 1973–2007
Air National Guard
105th Military Airlift Group/Military Airlift Wing/Airlift Wing – Stewart ANGB, New York
137th Military Airlift Squadron/Airlift Squadron, 1985–2012
164th Military Airlift Wing/Airlift Wing – Memphis, Tennessee
155th Military Airlift Squadron/Airlift Squadron, 2004–2013
167th Military Airlift Wing/167th Airlift Wing – Martinsburg, West Virginia
167th Military Airlift/167th Airlift Squadron, 2006–2015

Incidents and accidents

Three C-5 Galaxy aircraft have been lost in crashes along with two class-A losses resulting from ground fire, with a combined total of 169 fatalities. At least two other C-5 crashes have resulted in major airframe damage, but the aircraft were repaired and returned to service.

Notable accidents
 On 27 May 1970, C-5A AF Serial No. 67-0172 was destroyed during a ground fire at Palmdale, California, after an Air Turbine Motor started backwards and quickly overheated, setting the hydraulic system on fire and consuming the aircraft. The engines were not running at the time of the fire. Five crew escaped, and seven firefighters suffered minor injuries fighting the blaze.
 On 17 October 1970, C-5A AF Serial No. 66-8303 was destroyed during a ground fire at the Lockheed Aircraft plant at Dobbins AFB in Marietta, Georgia. The fire started during maintenance in one of the aircraft's 12 fuel cells. One worker was killed and another injured. This was the first C-5 aircraft produced.
 On 27 September 1974, C-5A Serial No. 68-0227 crashed after over-running the runway at Clinton, Oklahoma, Municipal Airport during an emergency landing following a serious landing gear fire. The crew mistakenly aligned the aircraft for the visual approach into the wrong airport, landing at Clinton Municipal Airport, which has a  runway, instead of the airfield at Clinton-Sherman Industrial Airpark (former Clinton-Sherman Air Force Base), which has a  runway. This was the first operational loss of a C-5 Galaxy.
 On 4 April 1975, C-5A Serial No.68-0218 crashed while carrying orphans out of Vietnam during Operation Babylift. This accident is one of the most notorious C-5 accidents to date. The crash occurred while trying to make an emergency landing at Tan Son Nhut Air Base, Saigon, following a rear pressure door lock failure in flight. 144 people (including 78 children) were killed out of the 313 aboard (243 children, 44 escorts, 16 flight crew and 10 medical crew). Use of the C-5 was heavily restricted for several months following the high-profile accident.
 On 31 July 1983, C-5A Serial No. 70-0446 crashed while landing at the former Shemya Air Force Base on Shemya Island in Alaska. The C-5 approached below the glide slope in heavy fog, hit landing light poles and an embankment short of the runway, stopping at the 5,000-foot mark on the runway with the nose gear at the side of the runway embankment. Structural damage was extensive and the two aft main landing gear bogies were sheared from the aircraft. There were no fatalities. A joint USAF–Lockheed team made repairs, enabling a ferry flight from Shemya to the Lockheed plant in Marietta, Georgia, later that year. There, the aircraft was dubbed Phoenix II and permanent repair efforts got under way. In addition to the structural repairs, the aircraft also received an improved landing gear system (common to the then-new C-5B), wing modification, and a color weather radar upgrade. The aircraft was returned to service.
 In July 1983, C-5A Serial No. 68-0216 landed gear up at Travis Air Force Base, California. There were no injuries. The accident occurred while the crew was performing touch-and-go landings, and did not lower the landing gear during the final approach of the day. The aircraft received significant damage to the lower fuselage, ramp, clamshell doors, and main landing gear pods. The C-5A was later flown to Marietta for repairs. While there, the aircraft was selected to be the first C-5A converted to the C-5C configuration.
 On 29 August 1990, C-5A Serial No. 68-0228 crashed following an engine failure shortly after take-off. The aircraft took off from Ramstein Air Base in Germany in support of Operation Desert Shield. It was flown by a nine-member reserve crew from the 68th Airlift Squadron, 433d Airlift Wing based at Kelly AFB, Texas. As the aircraft started to climb off the runway, one of the thrust reversers suddenly deployed. This resulted in loss of control of the aircraft and the subsequent crash. Of the 17 people on board, only four survived the crash. All four were in the rear troop compartment. The sole crew member to survive, Staff Sgt. Lorenzo Galvan Jr., was awarded the Airman's Medal for his actions in evacuating the survivors from the wreckage.
 On 3 April 2006, C-5B Serial No. 84-0059 crashed following a cockpit indication that the thrust reverser on No.2 engine was not locked. The crew shut down No.2 engine as a safeguard. The C-5B assigned to the 436th Airlift Wing and flown by a reserve crew from the 709th Airlift Squadron, 512th Airlift Wing crashed about  short of the runway while attempting a heavyweight emergency landing at Dover Air Force Base, Delaware. The aircraft had taken off from Dover 21 minutes earlier and reported an in-flight emergency ten minutes into the flight. All 17 people aboard survived, but two received serious injuries. The Air Force's accident investigation board report concluded the cause to be human error, in particular the crew had been manipulating the throttle of the (dead) number-two engine as if it were still running while keeping the (live) number-three engine at idle. The situation was further worsened by the crew's decision to use a high flap setting that increased drag beyond normal two-engine capabilities. The aircraft was one of the first to receive the new avionics and glass flight displays for C-5 Avionics Modernization Program (AMP). This accident led to a redesign of the cockpit engine displays, particularly the visual indicators of a non-active engine. The aircraft was declared a total hull-loss and the airframe was scrapped, but the forward fuselage became a C-5 AMP test bed.

Aircraft on display
 C-5A, AF Ser. No. 70-0451, has been delivered to the Travis Air Force Base Heritage Center at Travis Air Force Base for future display. This is the penultimate operational C-5A, with the last operational C-5A delivered to Davis-Monthan Air Force Base for spare parts.
 C-5A, AF Ser. No. 69-0014, is on display at the Air Mobility Command Museum at Dover Air Force Base, Delaware. This is the first C-5 aircraft to go on museum display.

Specifications (C-5M)

See also

References

Notes

Citations

Bibliography

 Aging of U.S. Air Force Aircraft: Final Report. Washington, D.C.: National Research Council, National Academies, 1997.
 Bakse, Colin. Airlift Tanker: History of U.S. Airlift and Tanker Forces. New York: Turner Publishing, 1995. .
 Chant, Christopher. Air War in the Gulf 1991. Oxford, UK: Osprey Publishing, 2001. .
 Dunstan, Simon. The Yom Kippur War: the Arab-Israeli War of 1973. Oxford, UK: Osprey Publishing, 2007. .
 "The Giants of Georgia". Air International, Vol. 26, No. 2, February 1984, pp. 61–68, 87–90. .
 Government Accountability Office. Military Readiness: DOD Needs to Identify and Address Gaps and Potential Risks in Program Strategies and Funding Priorities for Selected Equipment. Darby, Pennsylvania: DIANE Publishing, 2006. .
 Improving Strategic Mobility: The C-17 Program and Alternatives. Washington, D.C.: Congressional Budget Office, United States Congress, September 1986. .
 Irving, Clive. Wide Body: The Triumph of the 747. New York: W. Morrow, 1993. .
 Jenkins, Dannis J. Lockheed Secret Projects: Inside the Skunk Works. St. Paul, Minnesota: Zenith Imprint, 2001. .
 Miller, David. Conflict Iraq: Weapons and Tactics of the US and Iraqi Forces. St. Paul, Minnesota: Zenith Imprint, 2003. .
 Nalty, Bernard C. Winged Shield, Winged Sword 1950–1997: A History of the United States Air Force. Minerva Group, 2003. .
 Lippincott, Richard. C-5 Galaxy in Action. Carrollton, Texas: Squadron/Signal Publications, 2006. .
 Norton, Bill. Lockheed Martin C-5 Galaxy. North Branch, Minnesota: Specialty Press, 2003. .
 Philips, Warren F. Mechanics of Flight. Hoboken, New Jersey: John Wiley and Sons, 2004. .
 Reed, Chris. Lockheed C-5 Galaxy. Atglen, Pennsylvania: Schiffer Publishing, 2000. .
 
 Tillman, Barrett. What We Need: Extravagance and Shortages in America's Military. Zenith Imprint, 2007. ISBN −076032-869-2.
 Veronico, Nick and Jim Dunn. 21st Century U.S. Air Power. St. Paul, Minnesota: Zenith Imprint, 2004. .

External links

 C-5 A/B/C Galaxy and C-5M Super Galaxy U.S. Air Force fact sheet
 C-5M page on LockheedMartin.com
 "Fatigue and Related Human Factors in the Near Crash of a Large Military Aircraft". Aviation, Space, and Environmental Medicine, Volume 77, Number 9, September 2006, pp. 963–970.
 C5 wing vortex study (NASA video) 

C-005 Galaxy
1960s United States military transport aircraft
Quadjets
High-wing aircraft
T-tail aircraft
Aircraft first flown in 1968